The Westerly Downtown Historic District is a historic district encompassing most of the commercial and civic district of Westerly, Rhode Island, United States.  It extends from Broad and Union Streets eastward along High Street, and north along Canal Street to Railroad Avenue, where it extends to include the historic railroad station.  The district contains a compact and cohesive collection of commercial and civic buildings built primarily during the last three decades of the 19th century and the first three decades of the 20th century, including the Old Town Hall (1872–74), the current Town Hall (1912), the Spanish Colonial railroad station (1912), and the Classical Revival post office (1914).

The district was listed on the National Register of Historic Places in 1984, with expansions in 1995 and 2007.

Representative contributing buildings

Among the contributing buildings of the Westerly Downtown Historic District are the following:

 Old Town Hall, designed by builder Charles Maxson and architect Alfred Stone (completed 1874)
 Westerly Memorial and Public Library, architect Longstaff & Hurd (completed 1894; addition 1924)
 Town Hall and Courthouse, architect William R. Walker & Son (completed 1912)
 Westerly Railroad Station (completed in 1912)
 Post Office, architect James Knox Taylor (completed 1914)
 Industrial Trust Co. Building (completed 1916)
 Washington Trust Co. Building, architect York and Sawyer (completed 1925)

Gallery

See also
Wilcox Park Historic District, which partially overlaps this district
North End Historic District (Westerly, Rhode Island)
National Register of Historic Places listings in Washington County, Rhode Island

References

External links

Westerly Pawcatuck Downtown Business Association

U.S. Route 1
Westerly, Rhode Island
Historic districts in Washington County, Rhode Island
Historic American Buildings Survey in Rhode Island
Historic districts on the National Register of Historic Places in Rhode Island
National Register of Historic Places in Washington County, Rhode Island